Hylarana guentheri (Günther's frog) is a species of frog in the family Ranidae. It was formerly placed in the genus Rana. It is found in China, Hong Kong, Macau, Taiwan, Vietnam, and possibly Cambodia and Laos. An introduced population is found on Guam. An alternate common name is Günther's Amoy frog, and the honorific is often spelled "Guenther's".

Its natural habitats are subtropical or tropical moist lowland forest, subtropical or tropical moist shrubland, subtropical or tropical dry lowland grassland, rivers, intermittent rivers, swamps, freshwater marshes, intermittent freshwater marshes, arable land, plantations, rural gardens, water storage areas, ponds, aquaculture ponds, irrigated land, seasonally flooded agricultural land, and canals and ditches. It is not considered a threatened species by the IUCN.

[[File:Parasite140015-fig3 Protoopalina pingi (Opalinidae) Drawing.tif|thumb|left|100 px|Protoopalina pingi, a parasite of the rectum of Hylarana guentheri in China]]

Parasites of this frog include the opalinid Protoopalina pingi'', in the rectum.

References

guentheri
Amphibians of China
Fauna of Hong Kong
Amphibians of Taiwan
Amphibians of Vietnam
Amphibians described in 1882
Taxonomy articles created by Polbot
Taxobox binomials not recognized by IUCN